Charles Gowan (February 6, 1850 – July 3, 1938) was an American and Canadian pioneer and politician.  He served as mayor of Antigo, Wisconsin and as a municipal councillor in Edmonton, Alberta.

Biography

Charles Gowan was born in New York and migrated to Wisconsin early in life.  There, he became a justice of the peace and one of the first school officers in Shawano County He served as mayor of Antigo and married Harriet Howland in 1869 before immigrating to Canada in 1900.  He originally settled near Namao, Alberta, but moved to Edmonton in 1904 where he engaged in logging and ranching.

Gowan ran for alderman on the Edmonton City Council during the 1910 election.  He was elected to a two-year term by finishing fourth of eleven candidates, but his term, along with those of his colleagues, was truncated by the merger of Edmonton and Strathcona.  He was re-elected to another two-year term in the amalgamated city's first election, finishing second of eighteen candidates, but resigned three months into this term.  He sought election once more later that year, but finished seventh out of seventeen candidates and was defeated.  In his final bid for elected office, he finished fifteenth of eighteen in the 1914 election.

Charles Gowan died in Edmonton July 3, 1938.

References

Edmonton Public Library Biography of Charles Gowan
City of Edmonton biography of Charles Gowan
Antigo Genealogy Gopher

1938 deaths
Mayors of places in Wisconsin
Wisconsin state court judges
Edmonton city councillors
People from New York (state)
American emigrants to Canada
People from Antigo, Wisconsin
American ranchers
Canadian ranchers
1850 births